The 2020 United States House of Representatives elections in Wisconsin was held on November 3, 2020, to elect the eight U.S. representatives from the state of Wisconsin, one from each of the state's eight congressional districts. The elections coincided with the 2020 U.S. presidential election, as well as other elections to the House of Representatives, elections to the United States Senate and various state and local elections. Primaries were held on August 11, 2020.

Overview

District
Results of the 2020 United States House of Representatives elections in Wisconsin by district:

District 1

The 1st district is based in southeastern Wisconsin, taking in Janesville, Kenosha, and Racine. The incumbent is Republican Bryan Steil, who was elected with 54.6% of the vote in 2018.

Republican primary

Candidates

Nominee
Bryan Steil, incumbent U.S. Representative

Primary results

Democratic primary

Candidates

Nominee
Roger Polack, former Intelligence Analyst at the United States Department of the Treasury

Eliminated in primary
Josh Pade, attorney and candidate for Governor of Wisconsin in 2018

Primary results

General election

Predictions

Polling

Results

District 2

The 2nd congressional district covers Dane County, Iowa County, Lafayette County, Sauk County and Green County, as well as portions of Richland County and Rock County. The district includes Madison, the state's capital, its suburbs and some of the surrounding areas. The incumbent is Democrat Mark Pocan, who was elected with 97% of the vote in 2018, without major-party opposition.

Democratic primary

Candidates

Declared
Mark Pocan, incumbent U.S Representative

Primary results

Republican primary

Candidates

Declared
Peter Theron, nominee for this seat in 2008, 2014 and 2016

Primary results

General election

Predictions

Results

District 3

The 3rd district takes in the Driftless Area in southwestern Wisconsin including Eau Claire and La Crosse. The incumbent was Democrat Ron Kind, who was reelected with 59.7% of the vote in 2018.

Democratic primary

Candidates

Nominee
Ron Kind, incumbent U.S. Representative

Eliminated in primary
 Mark Neumann, retired pediatrician

Withdrew
Justin Bonner, software engineer

Primary results

Republican primary

Candidates

Nominee
Derrick Van Orden, retired Navy SEAL

Eliminated in primary
Jessi Ebben, public relations professional

Declined
Patrick Testin, state senator
Steve Toft, U.S. Army veteran and nominee for Wisconsin's 3rd congressional district in 2018

Primary results

General election

Predictions

with Patrick Testin (R)

Results

District 4

The 4th district encompasses Milwaukee County, taking in the city of Milwaukee and its working-class suburbs of Cudahy, St. Francis, South Milwaukee, and West Milwaukee, as well as the North Shore communities of Glendale, Shorewood, Whitefish Bay, Fox Point, Bayside, and Brown Deer. The incumbent is Democrat Gwen Moore, who was reelected with 75.6% of the vote in 2018.

Democratic primary

Candidates

Nominee
Gwen Moore, incumbent U.S. Representative

Primary results

Republican primary

Candidates

Declared
Tim Rogers, nominee for Wisconsin's 4th congressional district in 2018
Cindy Werner, businesswoman and candidate for Wisconsin's 4th congressional district in 2018

Primary results

General election

Predictions

Results

District 5

The 5th district takes in the northern and western suburbs of Milwaukee, including Washington County, Jefferson County, as well as most of Waukesha County. The incumbent is Republican Jim Sensenbrenner, who was reelected with 61.9% of the vote in 2018. Sensenbrenner announced on September 4, 2019, that he would not seek re-election.

Republican primary

Candidates

Nominee
Scott Fitzgerald, majority leader of the Wisconsin Senate

Eliminated in primary
Cliff DeTemple, U.S. Coast Guard Reserve Commander

Declined
Scott Allen, state representative
Paul Farrow, Waukesha County executive
Chris Kapenga, state senator
Rebecca Kleefisch, former Lieutenant Governor of Wisconsin
Dale Kooyenga, state senator
Kevin Nicholson, businessman and candidate for U.S. Senate in 2018 (endorsed Fitzgerald)
Matt Neumann, businessman and son of former U.S. Representative Mark Neumann
Adam Neylon, state representative
Jim Sensenbrenner, incumbent U.S. Representative
Vince Trovato, Wisconsin campaign staff for President Donald Trump's 2016 presidential campaign
Ben Voekel, spokesman for U.S. Senator Ron Johnson
Leah Vukmir, former state senator and nominee for U.S. Senate in 2018
Matt Walker, digital strategy consultant and son of former Governor of Wisconsin Scott Walker

Endorsements

Primary results

Democratic primary

Candidates

Declared
Tom Palzewicz, U.S. Navy veteran and nominee for Wisconsin's 5th congressional district in 2018

Endorsements

Primary results

General election

Predictions

Results

District 6

The 6th district is based in east-central Wisconsin, encompassing part of the Fox River Valley, and takes in Fond du Lac, Oshkosh, and Sheboygan. The incumbent is Republican Glenn Grothman, who was reelected with 55.4% of the vote in 2018.

Republican primary

Candidates

Nominee
Glenn Grothman, incumbent U.S. Representative

Withdrawn
Melissa McClintick, clinical coder

Primary results

Democratic primary

Candidates

Nominee
Jessica King, former state senator

Eliminated in primary
Miachael Beardsley, IT consultant and board member for Our Wisconsin Revolution
Matt Boor, businessman

Primary results

General election

Predictions

Results

District 7

The 7th district is located in northwestern Wisconsin and includes Wausau and Superior. After the September 2019 resignation of Sean Duffy, Republican Tom Tiffany won a May 2020 special election to serve out the remainder of Duffy's term with 57.2% of the vote.

Republican primary

Candidates

Declared
Tom Tiffany, incumbent U.S. Representative

Primary results

Democratic primary

Candidates

Declared
Tricia Zunker, president of the Wausau School Board, Associate Justice of the Ho-Chunk Nation Supreme Court, and nominee for Wisconsin's 7th congressional district in the 2020 special election

Primary results

General election

Predictions

Results

District 8

The 8th district encompasses northeastern Wisconsin, including Green Bay and Appleton. The incumbent is Republican Mike Gallagher, who was reelected with 63.7% of the vote in 2018.

Republican primary

Candidates

Declared
Mike Gallagher, incumbent U.S. Representative

Primary results

Democratic primary

Candidates

Declared
Amanda Stuck, state representative

Primary results

Endorsements

General election

Predictions

Results

See also
 Voter suppression in the United States 2019–2020: Wisconsin
 2020 Wisconsin elections

Notes

Partisan clients

References

External links
Official campaign websites for 1st district candidates
 Roger Polack (D) for Congress 
 Bryan Steil (R) for Congress

Official campaign websites for 2nd district candidates
 Mark Pocan (D) for Congress
 Peter Theron (R) for Congress

Official campaign websites for 3rd district candidates
 Ron Kind (D) for Congress
 Derrick Van Orden (R) for Congress

Official campaign websites for 4th district candidates
 Gwen Moore (D) for Congress
 Tim Rogers (R) for Congress

Official campaign websites for 5th district candidates
 Scott L. Fitzgerald (R) for Congress
 Tom Palzewicz (D) for Congress

Official campaign websites for 6th district candidates
 Glenn Grothman (R) for Congress
 Jessica King (D) for Congress

Official campaign websites for 7th district candidates
 Tom Tiffany (R) for Congress
 Tricia Zunker (D) for Congress

Official campaign websites for 8th district candidates
 Mike Gallagher (R) for Congress
 Amanda Stuck (D) for Congress

2020
Wisconsin
United States House of Representatives